Lê Thị Oanh (born 9 February 1984) is a Vietnamese former footballer who played as a forward. She has been a member of the Vietnam women's national team.

International goals

References

1984 births
Living people
Women's association football forwards
Vietnamese women's footballers
Vietnam women's international footballers
Footballers at the 2002 Asian Games
Footballers at the 2006 Asian Games
Asian Games competitors for Vietnam
21st-century Vietnamese women
20th-century Vietnamese women